Jorge Ramón Cáceres (born 7 January 1948) is a former football forward.

Career
Born in Santiago del Estero, Argentina, Cáceres began his professional football career with San Martín de Tucumán. In 1973, San Martín sent him on loan to América de Cali for one season, but the club soon made the transfer to América permanent. He also played for Atlético Bucaramanga and Deportivo Pereira in Colombia.

Cáceres was a prolific goal-scorer. He scored in 24 consecutive matches, and led the league with 35 goals while playing for Pereira in 1975. He is one of the all-time leading Colombian league goal-scorers with 182 goals.

In 1976, Cáceres became a naturalized Colombian citizen. He made six appearances for the Colombia national football team in 1977.

References

External links

1948 births
Living people
Argentine emigrants to Colombia
Colombian footballers
Colombia international footballers
Argentine footballers
San Martín de Tucumán footballers
América de Cali footballers
Atlético Bucaramanga footballers
Deportivo Pereira footballers
Categoría Primera A players
Association football forwards
People from Santiago del Estero
Sportspeople from Santiago del Estero Province